John O. Aalberg (April 3, 1897 – August 30, 1984) was a Hollywood sound technician who worked on films including Citizen Kane and It's a Wonderful Life. He was a ten-time Oscar nominee, and received three technical awards from the Academy.

Aalberg was also married to Sara Jane Moore, who tried to assassinate President Gerald Ford. They had one child named Fredric W. Aalborg.

Filmography
Aalberg was nominated for ten Academy Awards:
 That Girl from Paris (1936)
 Hitting a New High (1937)
 Vivacious Lady (1938)
 The Hunchback of Notre Dame (1939)
 Kitty Foyle: The Natural History of a Woman (1940)
 Swiss Family Robinson (1940)
 Citizen Kane (1941)
 It's a Wonderful Life (1946)
 Two Tickets to Broadway (1951)
 Susan Slept Here (1954)

References

External links

1897 births
1984 deaths
20th-century American engineers
Academy Award for Technical Achievement winners
American audio engineers
Engineers from Illinois
People from Chicago
Recipients of the Gordon E. Sawyer Award
Recipients of the John A. Bonner Medal of Commendation